The American Straight Pool Championship is a prestigious professional straight pool (also known as continuous 14.1) tournament held in the United States since 2014. It is organized by promoter Peter Burrows.

Format 
The tournament has been held in the fall over a 4 or 5 day period.

42 or 48 players are subjectively ranked by skill level and evenly distributed into groups of 6 or 7 players for the initial round-robin phase. After, the players with the best records from each group move on to a 24 players single-elimination tournament. The 8 players with the best records get a bye. Matches are races to 125 during the round-robin phase and to 150 during the single-elimination tournament except for the final which is a race to 175 or 200.

In 2021, a women's division was added to the format. Fifteen women competed in 3 groups during the round-robin and eight of them move to a single elimination tournament. Kelly Fisher defeated Pia Filler in the finals with a score of 100-46.

Events 
Men

Women

References 

Pool competitions